Flashspun fabric is a nonwoven fabric formed from fine fibrillation of a film by the rapid evaporation of solvent and subsequent bonding during extrusion.

A pressurised solution of, for example, HDPE or polypropylene in a solvent such as fluoroform is heated, pressurised and pumped through a hole into a chamber. When the solution is allowed to expand rapidly through the hole the solvent evaporates to leave a highly oriented non-woven network of filaments.

See also
 Tyvek
 Melt blowing

References

Nonwoven_fabrics
Plastics
Synthetic_paper